Sulaiman Damit (28 March 1941 – 8 July 2016) was a Bruneian soldier who served as the Commander of the Royal Brunei Armed Forces (RBAF) from 1990 until 1994.

Early life and education

Sulaiman was born on 28 March 1941, at Kampong Keriam, in Tutong District. He received his formal education at the Malay School in Seria from 1948 until 1952. He then pursued his studies at the Anthony Abell College, Seria, from 1953 until 1960. Early in December 1960, the local newspaper and radio station released an announcement that there was a spot available for officer cadets to train at the Federation Military College in Malaya for two years. This was the beginning of the "three musketeers" voyage. Midway through December, 17 courageous young men showed up for the Tasek Lama selection procedure, where they were interrogated by a panel of four officers from the Royal Federation of Malaya Armed Forces in the gymnasium of Sultan Omar 'Ali Saifuddien (SOAS). Three people were chosen out of the seven who were shortlisted; they were Sulaiman Damit, Mohammad Daud, and Ibnu Apong. On December 24, 1960, they took their oaths before the magistrate and left Brunei the next day through Singapore.

They had basic military training during their first year as junior cadets, including parade drills, weapon handling, tactics, leadership, and the military code of justice. Additionally, they received academic instruction to get them ready for GCE 'A' Levels or the Higher School Certificate. The second year of their senior cadet training was more challenging. As part of the Royal Federation of Malaya Armed Forces, the cadets were temporarily posted to a battalion at Chepa Base in Kelantan and Mentakab Base in Pahang by November 4, 1961. This allowed them to serve and gain further experience.

The three cadet officers each received a promotion to second lieutenant after successfully completing their training on December 8, 1962, with a Sovereign's Parade. For the three cadets, it was a crucial day, and for the BMR, it was a historic turning point. The first three local officers were given significant roles and positions over time, taking on some of the duties that had previously been performed by British Loan Service employees. In 1961, he began his military training at the Federation of Malaya Military College in Sungai Besi until 1962. He also went to Overseas Joint Warfare, Old Sarum and Royal College of Defence Studies, London.

Military career

 Platoon Commander (1963)
 Int Officer (1965)
 Adjutant (2 March 1967 - 3 November 1967)
 R Coy Commanding Officer (11 November 1967 - 21 December 1969)
 B Coy Commanding Officer (22 December 1969 - 15 October 1972)
 HQ Coy Commanding Officer (16 October 1972 - 4 March 1974)
 SO (Land) (1 January 1979 - 17 March 1980)
 Force Personal Officer (18 March 1980 - 12 July 1984)
 Deputy Commander (13 July 1984 - 30 October 1986)
 Officer with Special Studies (15 January 1990)
 RBAF Task Force Commander (10 August 1990)
All three of the Musketeers were promoted to the rank of Major on 1 July 1969. Sulaiman was appointed as the second commander of the RBAF on 10 August 1990. He held the post until 29 September 1994. During his tenure as Commander, he oversaw further expansion of RBAF's bilateral defence ties with friendly countries. RBAF also earned its first Blue Beret in November 1992, for the participation of its officers in the United Nations Transitional Authority in Cambodia.

Later life and death

Upon his retirement in 1994, Sulaiman was appointed as Ambassador of Brunei Darussalam to Cairo, Arab Republic of Egypt. He held the post from 7 September 1995 to 3 June 1998. Dato Sulaiman died on Friday, 8 July 2016, at the age of 75. He was laid to rest at Bukit Sugan Muslim Cemetery in Tutong. He was survived by his wife, three sons, two daughters and five grandchildren.

Honours

Pehin Dato Haji Sulaiman was awarded the title of Pehin Datu Indera Setia by Sultan Hassanal Bolkiah on 3 October 1974. Examples of local and foreign honours awarded to him;

National 

  Order of Paduka Keberanian Laila Terbilang First Class (DPKT) – Dato Paduka Seri
  Order of Seri Paduka Mahkota Brunei First Class (SPMB) – Dato Seri Paduka
  Silver Jubilee Medal – (5 October 1992)
  Royal Brunei Armed Forces Silver Jubilee Medal – (31 May 1986)
  General Service Medal
  Long Service Medal (Armed Forces)
  Proclamation of Independence Medal – (1 January 1984)

Foreign 

 :
  Order of Loyalty to the Crown of Malaysia Commander (PSM) – Tan Sri (1995)
  Order of Military Service Courageous Commander (PGAT) – (1994)
 :
  Order of The White Elephant Knight Grand Cross (PCh (KCE)) – (1991)
  Order of the Crown of Thailand (PM (GCCT))  – (1987)
 :
  Bintang Yudha Dharma Utama 1st Class – (1993)
 :
  Darjah Utama Bakti Cemerlang (DUBC) – (1994)
 :
  Philippine Legion of Honor Commander – (1991)
 :
  Order of National Security Merit Tong-il – (1992)

References

1941 births
2016 deaths
Bruneian Muslims
Bruneian military leaders
Ambassadors of Brunei to Egypt
Honorary Commanders of the Order of Loyalty to the Crown of Malaysia
Graduates of the Royal College of Defence Studies